Huashoutai or commonly known in its Cantonese name Wa Sau Toi was a Buddhist monastery on the sacred mountain Luofushan.  It was destroyed in early 20th century.

It is located in Boluo County, Huizhou, Guangdong, China.

History 
The Chan (Zen) teacher and Southern Dragon Kung Fu master Daai Yuk was a monk at Wa Sau Toi.

Lai Chi, the founder of the Wu Jo An nunnery in Guangzhou, was 35th generation in the Caodong (Japanese: Sōtō) school of Chan Buddhism from Wa Sau Toi.

References

1949 disestablishments in China
Chan temples
Buddhist temples in Guangdong
History of Guangdong
Huizhou